Wladimir Resnitschenko (born 27 July 1965) is a Soviet fencer. He won a bronze medal in the team épée event at the 1988 Summer Olympics representing the Soviet Union. At the 1992 Summer Olympics, he won a gold in the same event representing Germany.

References

External links
 

1965 births
Living people
Soviet male fencers
German male fencers
Olympic fencers of the Soviet Union
Olympic fencers of Germany
Fencers at the 1988 Summer Olympics
Fencers at the 1992 Summer Olympics
Olympic bronze medalists for the Soviet Union
Olympic gold medalists for Germany
Olympic medalists in fencing
Sportspeople from Almaty
Medalists at the 1988 Summer Olympics
Medalists at the 1992 Summer Olympics